Estadio Hans Usko is a multi-use stadium in Guazapa, El Salvador.  It is currently used mostly for football matches and is the home stadium of AD El Tránsito ADET.  The stadium holds 3,000 spectators.
The stadium was named in tribute to Hans Gunter Usko the former head of Bayer, who was a major sponsor to ADET, who was killed in a robbery gone wrong .

External links
Stadium information

Hanz Usko